Yulin Naval Base is the traditional base of the People's Liberation Army Navy, located in the eastern suburb of Sanya, Hainan Province, China, next to Yulin Port. Further east on Yalong Bay is the new Longpo Naval Base, formerly called "Yulin-East", for the nuclear submarines and aircraft carriers.

See also
South Sea Fleet
Yulin Port

References 

Sanya
People's Liberation Army Navy bases
Military installations established in 1955